Our Man in Havana is an opera in three acts composed by Malcolm Williamson to a libretto by Sidney Gilliat based on Graham Greene's 1958 novel Our Man in Havana. Williamson's first full-scale opera, it was premiered on 2 July 1963 at Sadler's Wells Theatre in London.

Its first performance in East Germany was in Karl-Marx-Stadt (today Chemnitz) in May 1966, with Renate Härtel, Eva Lehoczky, Elisabeth Fuchs, Peter Slawow, Konrad Rupf, Egon Schulz, Gerhard Scherfling, Manfred Drescher, conducted by Gerhard Rolf Bauer.

After years of neglect it was revived in 2016 by Lyric Opera of Melbourne at the Melbourne Athenaeum theatre.

Roles

References

Operas by Malcolm Williamson
1963 operas
English-language operas
Operas based on novels
Operas set in the Caribbean
Operas